Jeno "Gene" Strenicer (born August 12, 1945) is a Canadian retired soccer player who played professionally in the North American Soccer League and the Major Indoor Soccer League.  He earned eight caps with the Canadian men's national soccer team between 1977 and 1980.

Professional
Strenicer fled Hungary and settled in Toronto in the 1970s. In 1973, he joined the Toronto Metros of the North American Soccer League.  The Metros merged with Toronto Croatia before the 1975 season and Strenicer player for the Toronto Metros-Croatia for three seasons.  In 1978, he moved to the Chicago Sting and finished his outdoor career with the Rochester Lancers in 1980.  He played indoor soccer with the MISL New York Arrows in 1982.

National team
For Canada, Strenicer played five times in World Cup qualifying in 1977, and three more times in 1980.

External links
 
 NASL/MISL stats

1945 births
Canadian expatriate sportspeople in the United States
Canadian expatriate soccer players
Canada men's international soccer players
Canadian soccer players
Chicago Sting (NASL) players
Association football defenders
Major Indoor Soccer League (1978–1992) players
New York Arrows players
North American Soccer League (1968–1984) players
Rochester Lancers (1967–1980) players
Toronto Blizzard (1971–1984) players
Phoenix Inferno players
Living people
Hungarian emigrants to Canada
Footballers from Budapest
Expatriate soccer players in the United States